Two Tongues is the first studio album by the supergroup Two Tongues, released on February 3, 2009.

Track listing

References

2009 albums